Admiral Sir William George Tennant  (2 January 1890 – 26 July 1963) was a British naval officer. He was lauded for overseeing the successful evacuation of Dunkirk in 1940. Tennant subsequently served as captain of the battlecruiser , when she searched for German capital ships in the Atlantic. He later aided in the setup of the Mulberry harbours and the Pluto pipelines, a crucial part of the success of Operation Overlord.

Biography
Born in Upton-upon-Severn and educated at nearby Hanley Castle Grammar School, Tennant joined the Royal Navy in 1905 at the age of 15, as a naval cadet at Britannia Royal Naval College. He was eventually appointed an acting sub-lieutenant, being confirmed in that rank on 15 December 1909, and was promoted to lieutenant on 30 June 1912, eventually specialising in navigation in 1913.

He then returned to the Harwich Force to serve aboard the cruiser  until 1919.

Tennant was promoted to lieutenant-commander 30 June 1920, and served as Navigating Officer aboard the battlecruiser  during the royal tour to India and Japan by Edward, Prince of Wales, between September 1921 and June 1922. He then served as an instructor at HMS Dryad, the navigation school at Portsmouth, before returning to sea in late 1924 to serve as navigating officer of the Repulse for another tour by the Prince of Wales the following year, this time to Africa and South America. For his services Tennant was made a Member of the Royal Victorian Order (Fourth Class) by King George V in November 1925.

Tennant was promoted to commander on 31 December 1925, and spent the next two years posted to the Admiralty, serving in the Operations Division. He served as Executive Officer of the cruiser  in the Mediterranean from March 1929, then on the staff of the Royal Naval Staff College at Greenwich from December 1930. He was promoted to captain on 31 December 1932.

From May 1935 he served as commanding officer of the cruiser  as part of the 3rd Cruiser Squadron in the Mediterranean, then from July 1937 was an instructor at the Imperial Defence College, London. In August 1939 he was appointed Chief Staff Officer to the First Sea Lord.

Second World War

Dunkirk Evacuation

On 26 May 1940 Tennant was appointed Senior Naval Officer ashore at Dunkirk, and ordered to Dover, where he took command of a naval party of eight officers and 160 men. Tennant's party was dispatched on board the destroyer  to aid in the evacuation of more than 300,000 British and French troops left stranded when France fell to the Nazis. Tennant's task was to organize the men and get them onto the ships waiting to take them. Tennant stayed right up until the last ships left on 2 June, patrolling the beaches of Dunkirk with a megaphone searching for British troops.

Tennant was lauded for his efforts at Dunkirk, and was appointed Companion of the Order of the Bath on 7 June 1940. The ordinary sailors under his command took to calling him "Dunkirk Joe".

Captain of the Repulse

Loss of the Repulse

Tennant and Repulse joined Admiral Sir Tom Phillips' Force Z, sent to Singapore to counter Japanese advancement in the Pacific, in December 1941. On 8 December, the day after Pearl Harbor, Singapore came under attack by Japanese air units, and Force Z departed for Malaya to attack a Japanese convoy, an operation that was cancelled shortly thereafter. Upon returning to Singapore, they received word of Japanese landings on Malaya, and Force Z - without air cover - made for Malaya to counter them.

On 10 December, the Japanese attacked Force Z. Tennant ably managed to avoid nineteen torpedoes dropped from Japanese aircraft, but Repulse eventually succumbed to a pincer attack, taking five torpedoes; she sank within twenty minutes, taking a great deal of the crew with her.

On 6 February 1942 he was promoted to rear-admiral, and in February 1943 received a mention in despatches for his part in operations on Madagascar.

Normandy

In June 1944, Tennant was placed in charge of the naval side of the transport, assembly and setup of the two Mulberry harbours that provided port facilities for the coming invasion of Normandy. In August, he supervised the laying of the Pluto pipelines between France and England, which provided much needed fuel supplies for the ongoing conflict. For his efforts in the success of the Normandy invasion, Tennant was appointed Commander of the Order of the British Empire by King George VI, and also received the United States Legion of Merit.

Post-war service
Tennant was promoted to vice-admiral on 27 July 1945, and upgraded to Knight Commander of the Order of the Bath in December 1945 for his war service. Appointed commander of the America and West Indies Station in 1946, he was promoted to admiral on 22 October 1948, and remained there until he retired in August 1949. In 1950, he was named Lord Lieutenant of Worcestershire, in which capacity he served until his death at the Worcester Royal Infirmary in 1963.

In film and fiction
In the 2004 TV series Dunkirk, Captain Tennant is played by Adrian Rawlins. In the 2017 Christopher Nolan film Dunkirk, the character of Commander Bolton, played by Kenneth Branagh, draws on the accomplishments of Captain Tennant during the evacuation of Allied troops from the eponymous French port.

Honours

United Kingdom

Awards from other countries

References

External links

 
 
 

|-

1890 births
1963 deaths
Academics of the Royal Naval College, Greenwich
Military personnel from Worcestershire
Royal Navy admirals of World War II
Lord-Lieutenants of Worcestershire
People from Upton-upon-Severn
Officiers of the Légion d'honneur
Recipients of the Croix de Guerre 1939–1945 (France)
Knights Commander of the Order of the Bath
Commanders of the Order of the British Empire
Foreign recipients of the Legion of Merit
Members of the Royal Victorian Order
Grand Crosses of the Order of George I
Royal Navy officers of World War I
Admirals and Generals from Worcestershire